Defence Services Command and Staff College is a government owned defense college that provides training to Bangladeshi military officers and is located in Mirpur, Dhaka, Bangladesh. Major General Md. Faizur Rahman is the current Commandant of DSCSC.

History
The institute was established on 30 December 1977 with the support of British Military Advisory Team. The college is run by Bangladesh Armed forces. A British Military Advisory Team (BMAT) headed by a Chief Instructor, was the founding and driving force in running the training curriculum in the initial days of the college. The inaugural batch had 30 students from all the three services of Bangladesh Armed Forces and Bangladesh Police. The college ran short courses of six-month duration jointly for the three services for the first three years. In 1980, the course duration was increased to 10 months. That year, a separate Air Wing was also opened, and invitation to overseas students was started. Separate Naval Wing was opened in 1982.

Since 1977, the course strength has been more than quadrupled. So far, 3230 students have graduated from the college. This includes 673 overseas students around the world.

References

1977 establishments in Bangladesh
Organisations based in Dhaka
Bangladesh Armed Forces education and training establishments